Andrew Coats is an American director, writer and animator at Pixar. He received critical appraisal and recognition with 2016 animated-short film Borrowed Time which he co-directed, wrote and released independently as a part of Pixar Co-op Program, which allow their animators to use Pixar sources to make independent films. Coats received an Academy Award for Best Animated Short Film nomination at the 89th Academy Awards, shared with Lou Hamou-Lhadj.

Filmography

Awards and nominations

References

External links
 

Living people
American animators
American producers
American directors
American animated film directors
American animated film producers
Blue Sky Studios people
Pixar people
Year of birth missing (living people)